

Squad

Competitions

Major League Soccer

U.S. Open Cup

MLS Cup Playoffs

CONCACAF Champions' Cup

Squad statistics

Final Statistics

References

Kansas City Wizards
Kansas City
Sporting Kansas City seasons
Kansas City Wizards